Rosalind Cecilia Hildegard Tanner (née Young) (5 February 1900 – 24 November 1992) was a mathematician and historian of mathematics. She was the eldest daughter of the mathematicians Grace and William Young. She was born and lived in Göttingen in Germany (where her parents worked at the university) until 1908. During her life she used the name Cecily.

Rosalind joined the University of Lausanne in 1917. She also helped her father's research between 1919 and 1921 at the University College Wales in Aberystwyth, and worked with Edward Collingwood, also of Aberystwyth, on a translation of Georges Valiron's course on Integral Functions. She received a L-És-sc (a bachelor's degree) from Lausanne in 1925.

She then studied at Girton College, Cambridge, gaining a PhD in 1929 under the supervision of Professor E. W. Hobson for research on Stieltjes integration. She accepted a teaching post at Imperial College, London where she worked until 1967.

After 1936, most of her research was in the history of mathematics, and she had a particular interest in Thomas Harriot, an Elizabethan mathematician. She set up the Harriot Seminars in Oxford and Durham. Rosalind married William Tanner in 1953; however, he died a few months after their marriage.

In 1972 she and Ivor Grattan-Guinness published a second edition of her parents' book The Theory of Sets of Points, originally published in 1906.

Rosalind Tanner died on 24 November 1992.

References

1900 births
1992 deaths
British historians of mathematics
20th-century British mathematicians
20th-century British historians
20th-century women mathematicians